Troublesome Night 17 is a 2002 Hong Kong horror comedy film produced by Nam Yin and directed by Lam Wai-yin. It is the 17th of the 20 films in the Troublesome Night film series.

Plot
Bud Gay is arrested for drug trafficking and sent to prison. When his mother, Mrs Bud Lung, visits him, she senses that a ghost is haunting him so she sends Bud Yan to help him. They learn that the spirit is a vengeful ghost of a woman, who had followed suit after her husband committed suicide when he was wrongfully imprisoned. All she wants is to see her husband's grave, which is located behind the prison. When the burial site cannot be found, she thinks she has been fooled so she unleashes her fury on everyone.

Cast
 Sam Lee as Mao
 Teresa Mak as Ng Mei-ho
 Law Lan as Mrs Bud Lung
 Simon Lui as Bud Pit
 Tong Ka-fai as Bud Gay
 Lee Siu-kei as Brother Gay
 Anita Chan as Audrey
 Ronnie Cheung as Bud Yan
 William Ho as Big Mic
 Baat Leung-gam as Officer Eight
 Mr Nine as Lai Chor-kau
 Onitsuka as Lai Chor-pat
 Anna Ng as Mrs Ng
 Law Shu-kei as prison warden
 Fung Chi-keung as prisoner
 Big Cheong as policeman
 Lam Wai-yin as Officer Kong
 Nelson Ngai as lawyer

External links
 
 

2002 comedy horror films
2002 films
Hong Kong comedy horror films
2000s Cantonese-language films
Troublesome Night (film series)
2000s Hong Kong films